Balmer may refer to:

 Balmer (crater), lava-flooded remains of a lunar crater
 Balmer (surname)
 the Balmer series of spectral lines

See also